Barycholos ternetzi is a species of frog in the family Strabomantidae. It is endemic to the Cerrado of central Brazil.
Its natural habitats are gallery forest and open areas in the Cerrado. It lives in the leaf-litter. This common species is declining. It is threatened by habitat loss caused by many sources (agriculture, logging, agricultural pollution, fires and dam construction).

References

Barycholos
Endemic fauna of Brazil
Amphibians of Brazil
Taxa named by Alípio de Miranda-Ribeiro
Amphibians described in 1937
Taxonomy articles created by Polbot